True Laurita O'Brien (born February 28, 1994) is an American model and actress. She is best known for her Daytime Emmy Award winning portrayal of Paige Larson on NBC's soap opera Days of Our Lives.

Early life 
O'Brien was born in Los Angeles, California, to Elizabeth Marie (née Domasin), a housewife, and John Richard O'Brien, a graphic designer. Her maternal first cousin is actress Hailee Steinfeld. Her maternal grandfather Ricardo Domasin was of half Filipino (from Bohol) and half African-American descent. Her maternal great-uncle is former child actor Larry Domasin.

Career 
O'Brien is signed with Ford Models. She started at the age of five when her mother got her into television commercials, and subsequently got into modeling at the age of 13. During her teenage years she modeled for the likes of Guess and Pottery Barn. O'Brien appeared in the Girlfriend perfume campaign with Justin Bieber, and as his second girlfriend in his music video, "One Time".  She began her acting career in 2012, when she guest starred in an episode of Jessie playing the role of Diamond Bloodworth.

In 2014, she joined the cast of the Daytime Emmy Award winning soap opera Days of Our Lives, portraying the role of Paige Larson; she debuted on March 3, 2014. O'Brien is signed to a two-year deal with the series. In June 2015, it was reported that O'Brien was let go from the soap, and last appeared on September 9, 2015. In 2016, she joined the series Queen Sugar as Stella.

Personal life 
In 2015, O'Brien began a relationship with her former Days of Our Lives co-star Casey Moss. They became engaged on June 9, 2022.

Her hobbies include kickboxing and yoga.

Filmography

Awards and nominations

References

External links 

Living people
Female models from California
American actresses of Filipino descent
American soap opera actresses
1994 births
Actresses from Los Angeles
21st-century American actresses
American television actresses
Daytime Emmy Award winners
Daytime Emmy Award for Outstanding Younger Actress in a Drama Series winners
People of African-American descent
21st-century African-American women